Neil E. Reid (April 24, 1871 – May 4, 1956) was an American jurist.

Born in Bruce Township, Macomb County, Michigan, Reid went to high school in Almont, Michigan and Romeo, Michigan. He then studied for a year at Harvard University and received his law degree from Detroit College of Law in 1896. Reid served as probate judge and was a Republican. Reid served on the Michigan Supreme Court from 1944 until his death in 1956 and was chief justice in 1951. Reid died in a hospital in Mount Clemens, Michigan.

Notes

1871 births
1956 deaths
People from Macomb County, Michigan
Harvard University alumni
Detroit College of Law alumni
Michigan Republicans
Michigan state court judges
Chief Justices of the Michigan Supreme Court
Justices of the Michigan Supreme Court
20th-century American judges